The 1893 Penn Quakers football team represented the University of Pennsylvania in the 1893 college football season. The Quakers finished with a 12–3 record in their second year under head coach and College Football Hall of Fame inductee, George Washington Woodruff. Significant games included victories over Navy (34–0), Penn State (18–6), Lafayette (82–0), and Cornell (50–0), and losses to national champion Princeton (4–0), Yale (14–6), and Harvard (26–4).  The 1893 Penn team outscored its opponents by a combined total of 484 to 62. No Penn players were honored on the 1893 College Football All-America Team, as all such honors went to players on the Princeton, Harvard and Yale teams.

Schedule

References

Penn
Penn Quakers football seasons
Penn Quakers football